Galicia's two major economic poles are A Coruña and Vigo, with A Coruña in the lead, producing an estimated 33.2% of VAT receipts against 24.3% from Vigo. 
A third economic center is Santiago de Compostela, capital of Galicia. Other important cities are Ferrol and Pontevedra. In recent years the distance has grown between the interior provinces, Lugo and Ourense, which are more rural and less developed, and the coastal provinces, Pontevedra and A Coruña, particularly the areas situated along the axis of the A-9 Highway.

There is also a growing economic sector in Fair Trade and alternative economy.

Background 
Galicia is the fifth largest autonomous region in Spain by area, with its own language, and cultural traditions which, like Catalonia and the Basque Country, set it apart from the rest of Spain.

Development in the 20th century 
Francisco Franco was born in Galicia, however during the Civil War and the Francoist dictatorship (1936-1975) his government banned all regional languages (including Galician) from public use. During those years the region was neglected by the central government  and lagged behind other regions during the Spanish miracle of the 1960s and 1970s.

Contemporary economy  
Today, Galicia is a producer and manufacturer of several goods, including automobiles, ships, fashion garments and timber. Vigo produces 17% of all the automobiles manufactured in Spain. The port of Vigo is also important for shipping and seafood exports. Galician productivity of timber stands at 207.95 m3/k2.

Local related books 
Guisan, Maria-Carmen: Galicia 2000. Industria y empleo. University of Santiago de Compostela, Spain. Free on line at: http://www.usc.es/economet/galicia.htm,
 Prada Blanco, Albino y Lago Peñas, Santiago (2009): "Galicia, unha economía europea 1986-2006", Vigo, Editorial Galaxia
 Prada Blanco, Albino (coord.) (2007): "Globalización, competencia e deslocalización. Perspectivas dende Galicia", Santiago, Xunta de Galicia, https://web.archive.org/web/20140309112634/http://webs.uvigo.es/aprada/pdfs/Globalizacion%20competencia%20deslocalizacion.pdf
 Prada Blanco, Albino (2004): "Economía de Galicia. Situación actual y perspectivas", Santiago, tresCtres
 Prada Blanco, Albino (1999): "Economía de Galicia", Vigo, Edicións Xerais de Galicia

See also 
 History of Galicia

References 

Hulbert, Claudia. "OECD 28th Territorial Development Policy Committee." OECD. N.p., 4 Dec. 2012. Web. 21 Oct. 2013.

Economy of Galicia (Spain)
Galicia
Galicia (Spain)